Thomas Happe (born March 25, 1958) is a former West German handball player who competed in the 1984 Summer Olympics.

He was a member of the West German handball team which won the silver medal. He played five matches.

Happe is the son of Olympic swimmer Ursula Happe.

References

External links

1958 births
Living people
German male handball players
Handball players at the 1984 Summer Olympics
Olympic handball players of West Germany
Olympic silver medalists for West Germany
Olympic medalists in handball
Medalists at the 1984 Summer Olympics
Sportspeople from Dortmund
21st-century German people
20th-century German people